The 2014–15 Oman Professional League Cup (known as the Mazda Professional Cup for sponsorship reasons) is the fourth edition of a domestic football competition held in Oman.

The competition features four groups of 3-4 teams (Group A and B featured 4 teams and Group C and D featured 3 teams), with the group stage winners entering the semi-finals stage. Groups featuring three sides played each other twice so that each team could play 6 matches in the group phase.

The competition featured all the clubs playing in the top flight in the 2014–15 season.

The competition began on 13 November 2014, and will conclude on 29 January 2015.

In 2014, ahead of the 2014–15 Oman Professional League Cup, it was announced by Oman Football Association that Mazda have agreed to sponsor the Professional League Cup and will henceforth be known as the Mazda Professional Cup, for a period of four years. According to a four-year agreement reached by the two parties, Mazda became the title sponsor of the 14-team competition.

Group stage

Group A

Group B

Group C

Group D

Quarter finals

Semi finals

Finals

Statistics

Top scorers

Top Omani Scorers

See also
2014–15 Oman Professional League
2014–15 Sultan Qaboos Cup

References

External links
2014-15 Oman Professional League Cup - GOALZZ.com

Oman Professional League Cup
Professional League Cup
Professional League Cup